The Stott Highway is the road from Angaston through Sedan and Swan Reach to Loxton in South Australia. It was named after Tom Stott in 2008. Stott was a long-time farmer in, and member of state parliament for, areas traversed by the highway.

Major intersections

References

Highways in South Australia
Riverland